Polyporoletus is a genus of fungi in the family  Albatrellaceae. The genus was first described by mycologist Walter H. Snell in 1936 to accommodate an unusual terrestrial polypore with a stipe that had been found in the ground in pine-oak woods in Fentress County, Tennessee. He named this specimen Polyporoletus sublividus; the generic name refers to the possible relationship to both the boletes and the polypores. Although this species would be later transferred to the genus Scutiger, it is now considered to be Polyporoletus. Currently there is only one other species in the genus, P. neotropicus Mata & Ryvarden (2007).

References

External links

Russulales
Russulales genera